Bjørnseth is a Norwegian surname. Notable people with the surname include:

Bjørn Bjørnseth (1888–1976), Norwegian equestrian
Finn Bjørnseth (geodesist)
Finn Bjørnseth (1924–1973), Norwegian novelist, poet, and short story writer

 Norwegian-language surnames